Maja e Grebenit is a mountain in Albania, located near its most northern tip, in the Accursed Mountains range. It reaches a height of 1,840 metres. It is located just south of the fertile valley of the Vermosh river, close to the border with Montenegro.

Maja e Grebenit is located in the municipality Kelmend, and is surrounded by the villages Vermosh, Lepush and Selcë.

References

Grebenit
Accursed Mountains